The 1929 All-Pro Team consisted of American football players chosen by various selectors for the All-Pro team of the National Football League (NFL) for the 1929 NFL season. Teams were selected by, among others, the Green Bay Press-Gazette (GB), based on the return of 16 ballots sent to the team owners, managers, and sports writers of clubs in the NFL, Collyer's Eye magazine (CE), and the Chicago Tribune (CT).

Team

References

All-Pro Teams
1929 National Football League season